Alexander Sean Pablo Robertson (born 17 April 2003) is a professional footballer who plays as a midfielder for Manchester City. Born in Scotland and raised mainly in Australia, he has represented England at youth international level.

Early life
Robertson was born in Dundee, Scotland to a Peruvian mother and Australian father, Mark who played football professionally. He moved to his father's native Australia at the age of four, where he lived in the Sydney suburb of Maroubra between the ages of five and twelve. After playing for the youth teams of local club Hakoah Sydney City East, he was scouted and signed by English club Manchester United, where he played for 2 years.

Club career

Manchester City
After leaving Manchester United for rivals Manchester City at under-15 level, Robertson rose quickly through the youth ranks to establish himself as a top young prospect, and was included in The Guardian's "Next Generation" list for 2020.

He made one appearance in the EFL Trophy in the 2020–21 season, in a 2–1 loss to Tranmere Rovers.

Despite numerous injuries, Robertson was involved in first-team training on a regular basis, citing fellow midfielder Fernandinho as a mentor.

Loan to Ross County
On 5 July 2021, Robertson joined Scottish club Ross County on a season-long loan, with manager Malky Mackay stating that he had been tracking the young midfielder "for four years".

He made his debut for Ross County on 21 July 2021, in a 1–0 Scottish League Cup win over Brora Rangers, coming on as a 66th minute substitute for fellow loanee Jake Vokins.

Robertson returned to Manchester City early in January 2022.

International career
Robertson is eligible to represent Australia through his father, Scotland through birth, Peru through his mother, and England, having lived there for a most of his teen life. He has represented Australia and England at youth international level. On 14 March 2023 he was called to represent the Australia men's national soccer team for two friendly matches against Ecuador.

Personal life
Robertson is the son of former Australian international soccer player Mark Robertson.

His grandfather, Alex, was also an Australian international soccer player.

Career statistics

References

2003 births
Living people
Footballers from Dundee
Australian soccer players
English footballers
Scottish footballers
Association football midfielders
Hakoah Sydney City East FC players
Manchester United F.C. players
Manchester City F.C. players
Ross County F.C. players
Scottish Professional Football League players
England youth international footballers
Australia youth international soccer players
Australian people of Peruvian descent
English people of Australian descent
English people of Peruvian descent
Scottish people of Australian descent
Scottish people of Peruvian descent